St. Mary's Cathedral, Edinburgh may refer to:
 St Mary's Cathedral, Edinburgh (Episcopal)
 The Metropolitan Cathedral of the Assumption, Edinburgh (Catholic)